The 1987 Brazilian Grand Prix was a Formula One motor race held on 12 April 1987 at the Jacarepaguá Circuit in Rio de Janeiro. The race, contested over 61 laps, was the sixteenth Brazilian Grand Prix and the eighth to be held at Jacarepaguá, and the first race of the 1987 Formula One season.

The race was won by defending World Champion Alain Prost, driving a McLaren-TAG. Local hero Nelson Piquet was second in a Williams-Honda, while Prost's new teammate Stefan Johansson took third.

Qualifying
March Engineering returned to Formula One for the first time since the 1982 Caesars Palace Grand Prix, entering a single car driven by Ivan Capelli.

Previously the fee for a drivers Super Licence had been US$825. However, from 1987 drivers who scored World Championship points the previous season would be required to pay more (i.e. the more points a driver scored, the more he paid for his licence) with drivers such as World Champion Alain Prost and Williams pair Nigel Mansell and Nelson Piquet were all required to pay around $12,000 (while others such as Lotus rookie Satoru Nakajima only had to pay the basic fee). According to the drivers, it wasn't so about the money, it was the principle that a licence is a licence and that the fee should be the same for everyone. However, by the time the cars were ready for Friday morning's first practice session, everyone (or in some cases the teams) had paid the required licence fee.

Qualifying was dominated by the Honda powered Williams, with Mansell ahead of Piquet. Third was Ayrton Senna with his Lotus. The Lotus 99T, now in the Yellow and Blue colours of new sponsors Camel Cigarettes, was using the computer-controlled active suspension for the first time in the hope that its advantages (keeping the car at the optimum ride height) would give them an edge over the rest of the field. The total number of cars entered for the event was 23, but on race day the March team, who went into the race with a modified Formula 3000 car for F1 rookie Ivan Capelli due to their new car not being ready, ran out of Cosworth DFZs, blowing their last in the Sunday morning warm-up and there were only 22 starters.

Qualifying also saw the FIA's controversial pop-off valves used for the first time on the turbocharged cars. The valves limited turbo boost pressure to 4.0 Bar where previously boost was only limited to what the engineers felt the engines could take. The valves were far from popular with the teams and drivers, however, with some drivers complaining throughout the weekend that they were cutting in too early and not allowing enough boost. Arrows driver Derek Warwick told that at times his valve was opening at just 2.6 Bar (a loss of approximately ) while Benetton's Thierry Boutsen told that the two valves on his Ford V6 were both opening at different levels and both well below the 4 Bar limit. McLaren got around the pop-off valve problem by limiting turbo boost on their TAG-Porsche engines to just 3.6 Bar of pressure throughout the weekend, thus never allowing the valves to come into play. One unnamed team mechanic was reported to have said that the valves were the only crude piece of engineering on a modern Grand Prix car.

The Ligier team was absent from Rio, missing their first race since the French boycott of the 1985 South African Grand Prix. The team had been set to use a new 4-cylinder, turbocharged Alfa Romeo engine for the season. However, during pre-season testing lead driver René Arnoux compared the new 415T to used food. This gave Alfa's parent company Fiat the excuse they wanted to pull out of its association with the team leaving Ligier without an engine for the season, though Ligier were able to secure a supply of Megatron turbo's from the Arrows team sponsors USF&G and would use them from San Marino until the end of the season.

Race
At the start Piquet was fastest, taking the lead from Senna, while Mansell made a bad start; the Benetton B187s of Boutsen and Teo Fabi out dragged Mansell and Prost. Adrián Campos was disqualified for an incorrect starting procedure, he had forgotten his ear plugs and by the time he had fitted them on the grid the rest of the field had moved away on the warm-up lap. Campos resumed his grid position instead of starting at the rear, and race officials removed him for his rookie mistake. Piquet's lead did not last long: on lap 7, he had to pit with engine overheating caused by litter on the track getting into the radiator sidepods. He rejoined back in eleventh position, leaving Senna to lead Mansell (who in the meantime fought back to second) although he too entered in the pits to have his radiators cleared. He rejoined behind Piquet and the pair began to climb through the field.

Senna pitted because of handling troubles of his Lotus 99T and so Prost went into the lead. When Prost stopped for fresh tyres the lead was briefly passed to Thierry Boutsen, who was performing admirably with his Benetton-Ford, but his lead lasted less than half a lap before Piquet went back to first before his second stop, on lap 21. Prost then went ahead again and led for the rest of the race, never looking threatened as he preserved his tyres to only require two stops, while his rivals Senna and Piquet had three.

Mansell's race was compromised late in the race by a tyre puncture, who sent him back to seventh place. On lap 51 Senna suffered an engine failure, causing him to retire from the second place he held for much of the race despite problems with the Lotus's active suspensions. Senna, who pulled off the track in front of the pits, reported that his engine had not actually blown, but that he could feel it was seizing and felt it would be better to retire rather than to destroy the engine.

Prost won ahead of Piquet, his teammate Stefan Johansson, Gerhard Berger (who battled for the whole race with handling problems of his Ferrari F1/87), Boutsen and Mansell, who caught the last point. Satoru Nakajima's first Grand Prix, saw him finish just outside the points in seventh in his Lotus. This was Prost's 26th victory, which made him the second most successful Grand Prix winner at the time, moving him ahead of Jim Clark and just one win behind tying with Jackie Stewart as the most successful.

Classification

Qualifying

Race 
Numbers in brackets refer to positions of normally aspirated entrants competing for the Jim Clark Trophy.

Championship standings after the race

Drivers' Championship standings

Constructors' Championship standings

Jim Clark Trophy standings

Colin Chapman trophy standings

 Note: Only the top five positions are included for all four sets of standings.

References

Brazilian Grand Prix
Brazilian Grand Prix
Grand Prix
Brazilian Grand Prix